Pitcairnia megasepala is a species of flowering plant in the Bromeliaceae family. This species is native to Costa Rica.

References

megasepala
Flora of Costa Rica
Taxa named by John Gilbert Baker